Caloria is a genus of colorful sea slugs, aeolid nudibranchs. They are marine gastropod molluscs in the family Facelinidae.

Species
Species within the genus include:

 Caloria elegans (Alder & Hancock, 1845)
 Caloria guenanti (Risbec, 1928)
 Caloria indica (Bergh, 1896)
 Caloria quatrefagesi (Vayssière, 1888)
 Caloria rosea (Bergh, 1888)
 Caloria sp. 1 black-dot nudibranch
 Caloria sp. 2 yellow-tipped nudibranch

Species which are currently transferred to other genera, or synonyms:
 Caloria australis Risbec, 1937 (nomen dubium)
 Caloria maculata Trinchese, 1888 accepted as Caloria elegans (Alder & Hancock, 1845) (synonym)
 Caloria militaris (Alder & Hancock, 1864) accepted as Phidiana militaris (Alder & Hancock, 1864)

References

Facelinidae